Events from the year 1970 in Michigan.

The Associated Press (AP) and United Press International (UPI) each selected the state's top news stories as follows:

 The controversy over public funding to parochial schools, including the Michigan Legislature's enacting of a measure granting state aid and a subsequent petition drive and constitutional amendment prohibiting such aid (AP-1, UPI-1);
 Contract negotiations between the United Auto Workers (UAW) and automobile manufacturers and a 67-day strike against General Motors that causes widespread layoffs and budget cuts (AP-2 [strike], AP-7 [effects of strike on state economy], UPI-2 [new contracts and GM strike]); 
 The trial and conviction of John Norman Collins for killing Eastern Michigan University student Karen Sue Beineman, one of the Michigan murders (AP-3, UPI-3);
 The death of Walter Reuther and his wife in a plane crash on May 9 at Pellston, Michigan (AP-4, UPI-5);
 The November 1970 elections in which William Milliken was elected Governor and Philip Hart was re-elected as U.S. Senator (AP-5, UPI-4);
 The multiple suspensions of Denny McLain and his later trade to the Washington Senators (AP-6, UPI-7);
 The discovery of mercury in Lake St. Clair fish and the Michigan Legislature's passage of a law allowing private citizens to sue polluters (AP-8 [mercury], AP-12 [legislation], UPI-6 [both]);
 The Goose Lake International Music Festival held from August 7 to 9 with widespread drug use (AP-9, UPI-8);
 A Supreme Court decision requiring public schools to provide free textbooks (AP-11, UPI-9); and 
 (tie) The kidnap and murder of Laurie Murningham and austerity measures adopted by the Michigan Legislature (UPI-10).

The AP and UPI also selected the state's top sports stories as follows:

 Denny McLain who was suspended in connection with a gambling controversy and then traded to the Washington Senators on October 9 (AP-1 [suspension], AP-8 [trade], UPI-1 [both]);
 The Detroit Tigers replacing Mayo Smith with Billy Martin as the team's manager (AP-6, UPI-2);
 The 1969 Michigan Wolverines football team's 10–3 loss to USC in the 1970 Rose Bowl, head coach Bo Schembechler's heart attack prior to the game, and his recovery from the heart attack (AP-3, UPI-3 [Rose Bowl] and UPI-8 [recovery from heart attack]);
 The 1970 Detroit Lions' finishing their season with five consecutive victories and their best record (10–4) since 1962 (AP-2, UPI-4);
 The 1970 Michigan Wolverines football team's winning its first nine games before losing to Ohio State, 20–9, on November 21 (AP-5, UPI-5);
 The Detroit Pistons' signing of their No. 1 draft pick Bob Lanier and then starting their 1970–71 season with a 12–1 record and 26–14 at the end of 1970 (AP-4 [both], UPI-7 [signing Lanier] and UPI-9 [fast start]); 
 Ralph Simpson's decision to quit the Michigan State Spartans men's basketball team to play professional basketball for the Denver Rockets of the American Basketball Association (AP-7, UPI-6);
 The 1970 Detroit Tigers' collapse during the last part of the season, compiling a 9–26 record from August 25 to September 29 (AP-9); 
 The Detroit Titans men's basketball team staging a preseason boycott to protest the coaching policies of Jim Harding (AP-10); and 
 The arrests of 11 men in connection with a Detroit-based sports national betting ring on New Year's Day (UPI-10).

Office holders

State office holders
 Governor of Michigan: William Milliken (Republican)
 Lieutenant Governor of Michigan: Thomas F. Schweigert (Republican)
 Michigan Attorney General: Frank J. Kelley (Democrat)
 Michigan Secretary of State: James M. Hare (Democrat)
 Speaker of the Michigan House of Representatives: William A. Ryan (Democrat)
 Majority Leader of the Michigan Senate: Emil Lockwood (Republican)
 Chief Justice, Michigan Supreme Court: Thomas E. Brennan

Mayors of major cities

 Mayor of Detroit: Roman Gribbs
 Mayor of Grand Rapids: C. H. Sonneveldt/Robert Boelens
 Mayor of Flint: Donald R. Cronin/Francis E. Limmer
 Mayor of Lansing: Gerald W. Graves
 Mayor of Dearborn: Orville L. Hubbard
 Mayor of Ann Arbor: Robert J. Harris (Democrat)
 Mayor of Saginaw: Warren C. Light

Federal office holders

 U.S. Senator from Michigan: Robert P. Griffin (Republican)
 U.S. Senator from Michigan: Philip Hart (Democrat) 
 House District 1: John Conyers (Democrat)
 House District 2: Marvin L. Esch (Republican)
 House District 3: Garry E. Brown (Republican)
 House District 4: J. Edward Hutchinson (Republican)
 House District 5: Gerald Ford (Republican)
 House District 6: Charles E. Chamberlain (Republican)
 House District 7: Donald W. Riegle Jr. (Republican)
 House District 8: R. James Harvey (Republican)
 House District 9: Guy Vander Jagt (Republican)
 House District 10: Elford Albin Cederberg (Republican)
 House District 11: Philip Ruppe (Republican)
 House District 12: James G. O'Hara (Democrat)
 House District 13: Charles Diggs (Democrat)
 House District 14: Lucien N. Nedzi (Democrat)
 House District 15: William D. Ford (Democrat)
 House District 16: John Dingell Jr. (Democrat)
 House District 17: Martha Griffiths (Democrat)
 House District 18: William Broomfield (Republican)
 House District 19: Jack H. McDonald (Republican)

Population

Sports

Baseball
 1970 Detroit Tigers season – Under manager Mayo Smith, the Tigers compiled a 79–83 record and finished fourth in the American League East.  The Tigers remained in contention through late August, but then compiled a 9–26 record from August 25 to September 29. The team's statistical leaders included Willie Horton with a .305 batting average, Jim Northrup with 24 home runs and 80 RBIs, Mickey Lolich with 14 wins, and John Hiller with a 3.03 earned run average. After the season ended, Mayo Smith was replaced by Billy Martin as the team's manager.
 1970 Michigan Wolverines baseball team - Under head coach Moby Benedict, the Wolverines compiled a 16–18 record and finished fourth in the Big Ten Conference.

American football
 1970 Detroit Lions season – The Lions, under head coach Joe Schmidt, compiled a 10–4 record and finished in second place in the NFL's Central Division. The team's statistical leaders included Greg Landry with 1,072 passing yards, Mel Farr with 717 rushing yards, Charlie Sanders with 544 receiving yards, and Errol Mann with 101 points scored.
 1970 Michigan Wolverines football team – Under head coach Bo Schembechler, the Wolverines won their first nine games before losing to Ohio State.  The team concluded its season with a 9–1 record and was ranked No. 9 in the final AP Poll. The team's statistical leaders included Don Moorhead with 1,167 passing yards, Billy Taylor with 911 rushing yards and 66 points scored, and Paul Staroba with 519 receiving yards. 
 1970 Michigan State Spartans football team – Under head coach Duffy Daugherty, the Spartans compiled a 4–6 record.

Basketball
 1969–70 Detroit Pistons season – Under head coach Butch Van Breda Kolff, the Pistons compiled a 31–51 record. The team's statistical leaders included Jimmy Walker with 1,687 points, Dave Bing with 418 assists and Otto Moore with 900 rebounds.
 1969–70 Michigan Wolverines men's basketball team – Under head coach Johnny Orr, the Wolverines compiled a 10–14 record. Rudy Tomjanovich led the team with 722 points and 376 rebounds.
 1969–70 Michigan State Spartans men's basketball team – Under head coach Gus Ganakas, the Spartans compiled a 9–15 record.
 1969–70 Detroit Titans men's basketball team – The Titans compiled a 7–18 record under head coach Jim Harding.

Ice hockey
 1969–70 Detroit Red Wings season – Under head coaches Bill Gadsby and Sid Abel, the Red Wings compiled a 40–21–15 record, finished third in the National Hockey League's East Division, and lost in the opening round of the playoffs to the Chicago Black Hawks. The team's statistical leaders included Gary Unger with 42 goals, Alex Delvecchio with 47 assists, and Gordie Howe with 71 points. The team's regular goaltenders were Roy Edwards and Roger Crozier.
 1969–70 Michigan Tech Huskies men's ice hockey team – Under head coach John MacInnes, Michigan Tech compiled a 19–12–3 record and finished fourth at the 1970 NCAA Division I Men's Ice Hockey Tournament.
 1969–70 Michigan Wolverines men's ice hockey season – Under head coach Al Renfrew, the Wolverines compiled a 14–16 record. 
 1969–70 Michigan State Spartans men's ice hockey team – Under head coach Amo Bessone, the Spartans compiled a 13–16 record.

Golf
 Buick Open – 
 Michigan Open –

Boat racing
 Port Huron to Mackinac Boat Race – 
 Spirit of Detroit race –
 APBA Gold Cup –

Other
 1970 NCAA Indoor Track and Field Championships – The fifth annual NCAA indoor championships were held at Cobo Arena in Detroit in March; Kansas won the team championship.
 Yankee 600 -

Music
Several songs performed by Michigan acts and/or recorded in Michigan ranked on the Billboard Year-End Hot 100 singles of 1970, including the following:
 "War" by Edwin Starr (No. 5), recorded at Hitsville U.S.A.
 "Ain't No Mountain High Enough" by Diana Ross (No. 6), recorded at Hitsville U.S.A.
 "Get Ready" by Rare Earth (No. 8), recorded at Hitsville U.S.A.
 "Ball of Confusion (That's What the World Is Today)" by The Temptations (No. 24), recorded at Hitsville U.S.A.
 "Signed, Sealed, Delivered I'm Yours" by Stevie Wonder (No. 31)
 "(I Know) I'm Losing You" by Rare Earth (No. 55), recorded at Hitsville U.S.A.
 "Still Water (Love)" by the Four Tops (No. 58)
 "It's a Shame by The Spinners (No. 76)
 "Up the Ladder to the Roof" by The Supremes (No. 88), recorded at Hitsville U.S.A.
 "Psychedelic Shack" by The Temptations (No. 91), recorded at Hitsville U.S.A.
 "Call Me" by Aretha Franklin (No. 100)

Other hit songs included:
 "Heaven Help Us All" by Stevie Wonder reached No. 9 on the Billboard Hot 100
 "Stoned Love" by The Supremes reached No. 7 on the Billboard Hot 100 and No. 1 on the R&B chart

Albums released by Michigan acts and/or recorded in Michigan in 1970 included the following:
 That's the Way Love Is by Marvin Gaye was recorded at Hitsville U.S.A. and released on January 8;
 Back in the USA by the MC5 was recorded at GM Studios in East Detroit and released on January 15;
 This Girl's in Love with You by Aretha Franklin was released on January 15;
 Psychedelic Shack by The Temptations was recorded at Hitsville U.S.A. and released on March 6;
 Easy Action by Alice Cooper was released on March 27;
 Marriage on the Rocks/Rock Bottom by The Amboy Dukes (featuring Ted Nugent) was released in March;
 Farewell by Diana Ross & The Supremes was released on April 13;
 Right On by The Supremes (first album without Diana Ross) was released on April 26;
 What Love Has...Joined Together by Smokey Robinson & The Miracles was recorded at Hitsville U.S.A. and released on April 28;
 Closer to Home by Grand Funk Railroad was released on June 15;
 Diana Ross by Diana Ross was released on June 19;
 Ecology by Rare Earth was released in June;
 Fun House by The Stooges was released on July 7;
 Signed, Sealed & Delivered by Stevie Wonder was recorded at Hitsville U.S.A. and released on August 7;
 Spirit in the Dark by Aretha Franklin was released on August 24;
 Mongrel by The Bob Seger System was released in August;
 A Pocket Full of Miracles by The Miracles was released on September 30;
 The Magnificent 7 by The Supremes and The Miracles was released in September;
 New Ways but Love Stays by The Supremes was released in October; and
 Live Album by Grand Funk Railroad was released on November 16.

Chronology of events

January

February

March

April

May

June

July

August

September

October

November

December

Births
 January 24 - Matthew Lillard, actor (Scream, Scooby-Doo), in Lansing, Michigan
 March 5 - Rome, R&B singer who had a No. 6 hit in 1997 with  "I Belong to You (Every Time I See Your Face)", in Benton Harbor, Michigan
 March 14 - Brent Gates, Major League Baseball infielder (1993-1999), in Grand Rapids, Michigan
 April 6 - Glenn Kessler, screenwriter, actor and producer (Damages), in Michigan
 April 14 - Steve Avery, Major League Baseball pitcher (1990-2003), NLCS MVP (1991), All-Star (1993), World Series champion, in Trenton, Michigan
 May 23 - Bryan Herta, race car driver whose Bryan Herta Autosport team won the 2011 Indianapolis 500, in Warren, Michigan
 June 1 - Alexi Lalas, soccer defender and member of Team USA at 1994 FIFA World Cup, in Birmingham, Michigan
 June 7 - Mike Modano, NHL player (1988-2011), the all-time scoring leader in NHL among American players, and inductee of Hockey Hall of Fame, in Livonia, Michigan
 June 8 - Kwame Kilpatrick, Mayor of Detroit (2002-2008), in Detroit
 June 16 - Cobi Jones, soccer midfielder for the Los Angeles Galaxy (1996-2007) and all-time leader in appearances for Team USA, in Detroit
 July 11 - Billy Ashley, Major League Baseball outfielder (1992-1998), in Trenton, Michigan
 July 19 - John Heffron, stand-up comic, in Detroit
 September 10 - Carl Quintanilla, journalist and anchor for CNBC and NBC, in Midland, Michigan
 October 4 - Craig DeRoche, 69th Speaker of the Michigan House of Representatives (2005-2006)
 October 15 - Mike Peplowski (1993-1996), NBA player, in Detroit

Gallery of 1970 births

Deaths
 February 5 - Rudy York, Major League Baseball player (1934-1948), 7× All-Star, World Series champion (1945), AL home run and RBI leader (1943), in Rome, Georgia
 February 17 - Thaddeus M. Machrowicz, U.S. Congressman (1951-1961), at age 70 in Bloomfield Township, Michigan
 May 9 - Walter Reuther, labor union leader who built the United Auto Workers into a major force, at age 62 in a plane crash at Pellston, Michigan
 May 31 - Terry Sawchuk, NHL goalie (1949-1970), at age 40 in New York City
 June 2 - Anna Thompson Dodge, one of the richest women in the world at time of her death, at age 100 in Grosse Pointe Farms, Michigan
 November 20 - Les Bingaman, Detroit Lions player (1948-1954), at age 44

Gallery of 1970 deaths

See also
 History of Michigan
 History of Detroit

References